Ángel Rubén Escobar Rivas (born May 12, 1965) is a former Venezuelan shortstop and switch hitter in Major League Baseball who played for the San Francisco Giants in its 1988 season.

Escobar hit .333 (1-for-3) with one run scored in  three games.

See also
 List of players from Venezuela in Major League Baseball

External links
, or Retrosheet, or Pura Pelota (Venezuelan Winter League)

1965 births
Living people
Águilas del Zulia players
Boston Red Sox scouts
Clinton Giants players
Fresno Giants players
Great Falls Giants players
Huntsville Stars players
Major League Baseball players from Venezuela
Major League Baseball shortstops
Navegantes del Magallanes players
People from Vargas (state)
Petroleros de Cabimas players
Phoenix Firebirds players
San Francisco Giants players
Shreveport Captains players
Venezuelan expatriate baseball players in the United States